Hebei University of Science and Technology (HEBUST) is one of the key, multi-disciplinary universities in Shijiazhuang, Hebei, China. It offers undergraduate degrees in science, engineering, humanities, and social science courses.

History 
Hebei University of Science and Technology (HEBUST) was founded in 1996 by incorporating former Hebei Institute of Chemical Technology and Light Industry, Hebei Institute of Mechano-Electric Engineering and Hebei Textile Staff & Workers University.

Campus
The university composes of four campuses; the Central Campus, the West Campus, the East Campus, and the Gaoxin Campus. The university covers an area of 2,312,000 square meters. The Central Campus, the main campus, is located in the center of Shijiazhuang city, capital of Hebei province, with beautiful surroundings and convenient transport facilities (280 km from Beijing and Tianjin). The university has a building area of 470,000 square meters. The fixed assets total up to 380 million yuan. The library contains a collection of nearly 1,300,000 volumes and 2000 kinds of scientific journals in Chinese and foreign languages. It has databases for such topics as academic journals of China, scientific journals in foreign languages, achievements in science and technology, enterprise products, and digital books, proceedings and periodicals. The exit width of the campus network, established in 1997, has reached 100M.

Administration 
The university is organized into 16 colleges, including 45 undergraduate specialties, among which environmental engineering and chemical technology are the key, province-level disciplines.  Nine disciplines have been authorized to grant master's degrees; they are mechanical manufacturing and automation, chemical technology, management science and engineering, environmental engineering, material processing engineering, applied computer technology, food science, fermentation, engineering, and textile chemistry and dyeing engineering.  The specialties consist of 7 categories:  engineering, science, liberal arts, economy, management, law, and medicine, which have nearly covered all the traditionally superior industries and high and new-tech industries of Hebei province.

Students and faculty

At present, more than 2,600 faculty members serve in the university, among whom there are more than 1,150 professional teachers, with 550 professors and associate professors. More than 19,440 full-time undergraduates, graduates and overseas students, as well as 12,100 adult students are now studying in the university, and more than 40,000 students have graduated from university since it was set up.

Programs

The university has been promoting opening and the academic exchanges with the outside world and has established co-operation with many universities and scientific research organizations, such as of Japan, the UK, the United States, Australia, Sweden, New Zealand and Canada, inviting foreign experts, scholars and teachers to teach English and give lectures all year round.

The university is based on the undergraduate and graduate education, and also attaches importance to enrolling foreign students. The major of Chinese language has a group of first-grade teaching staff, who can deliver lectures in English, Korean, Russian and Japanese. This makes study much easier, and thus promotes teaching quality for overseas students.

References

External links

 
Universities and colleges in Hebei
Educational institutions established in 1996
1996 establishments in China